Bear Creek is a stream in Miller County in the U.S. state of Missouri. It is a tributary of the Osage River.

Bear Creek was so named due to frequent sightings of bears near its course.

See also
List of rivers of Missouri

References

Rivers of Miller County, Missouri
Rivers of Missouri